1929 European Championship can refer to:

 1929 Ice Hockey European Championship
 1929 European Wrestling Championships
 1929 European Figure Skating Championships
 1929 European Rowing Championships